Lions Lions is an American post-hardcore band from Boston, Massachusetts.

History
Lions Lions began in 2008 with their first EP titled Direction. The following year the band released their first full length album titled From What We Believe via Panic Records. In 2010, Lions Lions released an EP titled The Path We Take.

In 2012 the band announced they were releasing their second full length album, titled To Carve our Names. The album was released on June 19 via Hollywood Waste Records. Also in late December 2012, the band released a digital EP titled Grounded.

In March 2015 Lions Lions released a six-song-EP titled Changing the Definition.

On April 21, 2017, they self-released a full-length album titled Monument.

Band members
Joshua Herzer - vocals
Brandon Davis - guitar
Chris Pulgarin - bass/vocals
Isaac Vigil - guitar
Derek Vautrinot - drums

Past members
Daniel Poulin - vocals
Van Truong - guitar 
Johnny Kay - bass/vocals
Phil Bjorkman - drums
Brian Cauti - drums
Nick Sjostrom - drums

References

Musical groups from Boston
Musical groups established in 2008